Galina Yenyukhina (born 1 October 1959) is a Russian former cyclist. She competed in the women's sprint at the 1992 Summer Olympics for the Unified Team.

References

External links
 

1959 births
Living people
Russian female cyclists
Olympic cyclists of the Unified Team
Cyclists at the 1992 Summer Olympics
Sportspeople from Krasnoyarsk